Daniel Ring (28 May 1900 – 9 February 1960) was an Irish hurler who played as a centre-back at senior level for the Cork county team.

Ring made his first appearance for the team during the 1919 championship and was a regular member of the starting fifteen until his retirement after the 1925 championship. During that time he won one All-Ireland medal and two Munster medals.

At club level Ring was a multiple county championship medalist with St Finbarr's.

References

 

1900 births
1960 deaths
St Finbarr's hurlers
Cork inter-county hurlers
All-Ireland Senior Hurling Championship winners